Brian Jeffrey Symons (born November 19, 1980) is a former American football quarterback. Symons played professionally for the Houston Texans and the Chicago Bears of the National Football League (NFL), the Frankfurt Galaxy and Berlin Thunder in NFL Europe, and the Tampa Bay Storm of the Arena Football League. He was originally drafted by the Texans in the seventh round of the 2004 NFL Draft (248th overall). He played college football for Texas Tech where he was a record setting passer. Symons never played in a regular season NFL game.

High school career
Born and raised in Houston, Texas, Symons was a standout quarterback at Cypress Creek High School. Symons completed 126 passes in 228 attempts for 1,597 and 11 touchdowns during senior season and rushed for 411 yards and seven touchdowns and was named first-team all-District 16-5A as a junior and senior. Symons completed 259 passes in 478 attempts for 3,704 yards and 27 touchdowns in two years as a starter during high school career. He was a member of SuperPrep Magazine's southwest top 100 and was listed as one of the top 100 players in the state by the Lubbock Avalanche-Journal, The Dallas Morning News, Fort Worth Star-Telegram, and Houston Chronicle. He was also a three-year starting pitcher in baseball for CCHS. Symons was offered scholarships by the Texas Tech Red Raiders and Oklahoma Sooners. Symons chose Texas Tech over Oklahoma, then coached by Spike Dykes. Symons was recruited by Mike Leach while he was the Sooners' offensive coordinator. Leach would later become his head coach in 2000 when he was hired as the head coach of the Red Raiders.

College career
Symons played for the Red Raiders from 1999 to 2003. Symons was the second-string quarterback for part of his redshirt freshman season in 1999, and backed up Kliff Kingsbury from 2000 to 2002. From 2000 to 2002 Symons saw action in 17 games completing 56 passes out of 80 attempts for a 70% completion rate and 7 touchdown passes in back-up duty.

2003 season
Symons started for one season as quarterback for the Texas Tech Red Raiders. During his only season as a starter (his senior year), Texas Tech finished the season 8–5, and Symons broke the FBS record for single-season passing yards at 5,833 yards (since surpassed by Bailey Zappe of Western Kentucky in 2021). Symons set the NCAA 12-Game Passing Record with 5,336 yards in 2003. He broke Ty Detmer’s record of 5,188, set in 1990 at BYU. Symons also established a new NCAA 12-Game Total Offense Record with 5,476 yards this season. At the time of his graduation Symons held the Big 12 and Tech record with 48 touchdown passes in one season. Symons broke Kliff Kingsbury’s school and Big 12 single-season record of 45 touchdown passes. During the season, B. J. Symons tore his ACL while celebrating a touchdown pass against Iowa State. Although his statistics suffered slightly, he was still able to complete the most prolific season of passing in NCAA history. After finishing his career by extending his single-season passing record to 5,833 yards, he told reporters he will undergo reconstructive surgery on his anterior cruciate ligament. Symons ended his senior year with 52 TD passes, second only to the 54 thrown by Houston's David Klingler in 1990. His favorite target, Wes Welker, tied an NCAA record by catching a pass in his 47th consecutive game.

During the season, he had a stretch where he threw for 4,036 yards in just 9 games including 586 yards against North Carolina State University, 661 yards against the University of Mississippi, and 505 yards against Texas A&M University.

2003 Houston Bowl
Tech was selected to play in the EV1.net Houston Bowl against the Navy Midshipmen at Reliant Stadium in Houston, Texas, giving Symons the opportunity to play his final collegiate game in his hometown. Symons threw touchdown passes to Nehimiah Glover, Jarrett Hicks, and 2 touchdown passes to Mickey Peters en route to a 38–14 win over Navy. Symons was selected as offensive MVP for the game, capping off his season with 5,833 passing yards and 52 touchdown passes.

Accolades
2003 Houston Bowl Most Valuable Player
Big 12 Conference Coaches' Second-team
The Dallas Morning News All-Big 12 Second-team
Sammy Baugh Trophy recipient (nation's top collegiate quarterback)
Associated Press All-Big 12 Second-team
Chevrolet National Offensive Player of the Year
Fort Worth Star-Telegram All-Big 12 Second-team
Big 12 Conference Academic Second-team
San Antonio Express-News All-Big 12 Second-team
 CollegeFootballNews.com All-America Honorable Mention
 NCAA record for single-season passing yards (5,833 yards)
 10th in 2003 Heisman Trophy voting

Professional career
In the NFL Combine, Symons weighed 211 pounds, was 6 feet 3 inches, and ran a 5.20-second 40-yard dash. He was selected in the seventh round of the 2004 NFL Draft by the Houston Texans. After spending a season with the Texans, he signed with the Frankfurt Galaxy and was the backup to Akili Smith. He was then signed and later cut by the Chicago Bears in 2006. Symons then played with the Berlin Thunder for the rest of the season, until the NFL Europe folded. In 2007, he signed with the Tampa Bay Storm of the Arena Football League. He was released from his contract when the team went bankrupt in 2009.

NCAA records
When his college career ended, Symons was the holder of 11 individual NCAA FBS records.

The NCAA record book also mentions Symons for the following items:
 Single-Game Yards Passing: 661 (Rank-4th) (vs Ole Miss) September 27, 2003
 Single-Game Yards Passing: 586 (Rank-23rd) (vs North Carolina St.) September 20, 2003
 Season Yards Per Game Passing: 448.7 (Rank-2nd) 2003
 Season Touchdown Passes: 52 (Rank-3rd) 2003
 Single-Game Yards Total Offense: 681 (Rank 5th) (vs Ole Miss) September 27, 2003
 Single-Game Yards Total Offense: 618 (Rank 14th) (vs North Carolina St.) September 20, 2003
 Season Yards Per Game Total Offense: 459.7 (Rank 2nd) 2003
 Annual Total Offense Champion (2003)

Personal life
Symons graduated from Texas Tech University with a Bachelor of Business Administration degree in management from the Rawls College of Business. He retired from Football at the end of 2009. He currently resides in the Houston, TX area where he works in Investment banking, is married and has three children.

See also
 List of NCAA major college football yearly total offense leaders

Footnotes

References

External links
 Texas Tech profile

1980 births
Living people
American football quarterbacks
Berlin Thunder players
Chicago Bears players
Frankfurt Galaxy players
Houston Texans players
Tampa Bay Storm players
Texas Tech Red Raiders football players
Rawls College of Business alumni
Players of American football from Houston